Symphyotrichum purpurascens (formerly Aster purpurascens) is a species of flowering plant in the family Asteraceae native to areas of Mexico and Guatemala.

Citations

References

purpurascens
Flora of Guatemala
Flora of Mexico
Plants described in 1854
Taxa named by Carl Heinrich 'Bipontinus' Schultz